Bronson Harrison (born 10 October 1985) is a New Zealand former professional rugby league footballer who played as a  forward in the 2000s and 2010s. He played for the Wests Tigers, Canberra Raiders and the  St. George Illawarra Dragons in the NRL and represented the New Zealand Kiwis at international level, being a part of the 2008 World Cup winning squad.

Biography

Background
Harrison  was born in Auckland, New Zealand,

He played his junior football for Five Dock and the Leichhardt Wanderers before being signed by the Wests Tigers.

Professional playing career

Wests Tigers
Harrison made his NRL debut for the Wests Tigers in Round 4 of the 2004 NRL season against the North Queensland Cowboys. As NRL Premiers, Wests faced Super League champions Bradford Bulls in the 2006 World Club Challenge. Harrison played from the interchange bench in the Tigers' 30-10 loss.

On 25 September 2008, although contracted to the Wests Tigers for a further season, Harrison was released and signed a 3-year deal with the Canberra Raiders.

Canberra Raiders
He joined the Raiders in 2009. After 2 years with the Raiders, Harrison was given the chance to co-captain 5 games in the 2011 season. On 14 November 2012, Harrison signed a 2-year contract with the St. George Illawarra Dragons starting in 2013, after being released from the final year of his Raiders contract.

St George Illawarra Dragons
The 2013 NRL season was Harrison's first with St George Illawarra Dragons.

In 2014, Harrison became an Australian Apprenticeships Ambassador for the Australian Government and is an Apprentice Mentor in the NRL's Trade UP With The NRL Program.

New Zealand
Harrison made his international debut for New Zealand in a test against France in 2005.

After missing out on the New Zealand national rugby league team 24-man squad for the 2008 Rugby League World Cup, Harrison played against the Kiwis for the New Zealand Māori in a warm up match. Following an injury to Brent Webb, Harrison was called in as a replacement in the New Zealand World Cup squad. He was a starting player in New Zealand's squad for the World Cup final victory over Australia.

Harrison was selected for the ANZAC Test and Four Nations in 2009, again being selected for both in 2010. For the 2010 Anzac Test, Harrison was selected to play for New Zealand at second-row forward in their loss against Australia. He was selected for the ANZAC Test in 2011 but after a disappointing year for the Raiders, missed out on the Four Nations squad that year.

References

External links
2012 Canberra Raiders profile
NRL profile

1985 births
New Zealand rugby league players
New Zealand Māori rugby league players
New Zealand national rugby league team players
St. George Illawarra Dragons players
Canberra Raiders players
Wests Tigers players
Balmain Ryde-Eastwood Tigers players
Rugby league second-rows
Rugby league locks
Rugby league players from Auckland
Living people